Kim Jiseok (1959 – 18 May 2017) was a South Korean co-founder, deputy director and head programmer of Busan International Film Festival (BIFF).

References

External links 
 

1959 births
2017 deaths